is a Japanese professional footballer who plays as defender for Kagoshima United FC on loan from Tochigi SC.

Club statistics
Updated to end of 2018 season.

References

External links

Profile at Tokushima Vortis

1990 births
Living people
Ritsumeikan University alumni
Association football people from Tokyo
Japanese footballers
J1 League players
J2 League players
J3 League players
Tokushima Vortis players
Tochigi SC players
Kagoshima United FC players
Association football defenders